Emerson Ramos Borges (born 16 August 1980), known as just Emerson, is a Brazilian footballer who plays as a defender for Italian  club Olbia.

Career
Born in Pirabeiraba, Joinville, Santa Catarina, Emerson started his professional career with Caxias.

In 2003, he left for Italy. As he was not a European Union citizen, Emerson only able to play for amateur side, starting at Atletico Calcio of Serie D

Nuorese
Emerson next joined Nuorese of Eccellenza Sardinia. He won twice promotion for the Sardinian side, which followed the team promoted to Serie C2 in 2006, which also made Emerson registered as professional players and able to sign by any Italian professional clubs, as FIGC only forbidden clubs signing non-EU players from abroad and from amateur league, except Serie A clubs had 1 conditional quota (for replacing non-EU players that sold abroad or released). Emerson was benefited to the clause that Serie D clubs which promoted to Serie C2 can hire their amateur non-EU players in previous season as professional players. Emerson then scored 9 league goals for Nuorese in professional league in  seasons before he left the club in January 2008.

Taranto
In January 2008, Emerson was transferred to Serie C1 side Taranto Sport in co-ownership deal. He made 11 appearances in the Italian 3rd highest level, and Taranto bought him outright by made higher bid in a closed tender between the 2 clubs.

Lumezzane
But in July 2008, he was loaned to Lumezzane of Prima Divisione Group A from Taranto (Group B), which became a co-ownership deal later. He was the regular starter of the team, and scored five goals in 2009–10 Lega Pro Prima Divisione.

On 25 June 2010, Lumezzane failed to agree a price for the remain 50% registration rights, thus the clubs submitted their bid in envelope to buy the rights from the opposite side (i.e. a closed tender). On 30 June, the envelopes opened in Lega Pro headquarter, and Lumezzane made a higher bid to buy Emerson outright.

On 13 July 2010, he signed a new three-year contract with Lumezzane.

Reggina
On 18 August 2011, he signed with Serie B club Reggina.

Livorno
 He scored his first goal in Serie A with a "stinging drive from " in a 3–3 draw with Torino on 30 October 2013, describing it as "absolutely the best goal of my career", then produced arguably a better one against Cagliari the following February: "collecting possession 40 metres from goal, [he] shifted the ball out of his feet and smashed an unstoppable left-footed effort into the top corner".

Serie C
On 18 August 2020 he joined Olbia.

Honours
Serie D: 2006
Eccellenza Sardinia 2005

References

External links
 Profile at CBF 
 
 Profile at Football.it 
 

1980 births
Living people
People from Joinville
Sportspeople from Santa Catarina (state)
Brazilian footballers
Association football defenders
Caxias Futebol Clube players
Nuorese Calcio players
Serie A players
Serie B players
Serie C players
Serie D players
Taranto F.C. 1927 players
F.C. Lumezzane V.G.Z. A.S.D. players
Reggina 1914 players
U.S. Livorno 1915 players
Calcio Padova players
FeralpiSalò players
Potenza Calcio players
Olbia Calcio 1905 players
Brazilian expatriate footballers
Brazilian expatriate sportspeople in Italy
Expatriate footballers in Italy